Syncopacma incognitana is a moth of the family Gelechiidae. It was described by László Anthony Gozmány in 1957. It is found in Germany, Austria, Romania, Ukraine and Russia.

The wingspan is about 12 mm.

References

Moths described in 1957
Syncopacma